Nicolás Massú was the defending champion.
Paolo Lorenzi won in the final 6–3, 7–6(2), against Blaž Kavčič.

Seeds

Draw

Final four

Top half

Bottom half

References
 Main Draw
 Qualifying Draw

Rijeka Open - Singles
Rijeka Open - Singles
Rijeka Open